The World Association of Eye Hospitals (WAEH) is an international network of eye hospitals, founded in 2007 in Rotterdam. It advocates ophthalmology practice through social outreach and by providing information on eye care and health administration.

Activities 
 Exchange information and knowledge 
 Exchange of personnel to enhance international network and exchange of best practice 
 Stimulate international scientific cooperation between members

Admission criteria (full member) 
The admission criteria include specialising at an eye hospital or eye department, with at least 5 sub-specialities (cornea, glaucoma, cataract, retina, pediatric, neuro, oculoplastics and uveitis), having carried out at least 5000 operations, possessing research and resident training programs, provision of community services, primary care and emergency service,  and meeting international and nation quality standards.

References 

International medical and health organizations
Eye hospitals
Ophthalmology organizations
Hospital networks